Suphisellus transversus is a species of burrowing water beetle in the subfamily Noterinae. It was described by Régimbart in 1903 and is found in Argentina, Bolivia, Brazil and Uruguay.

References

Suphisellus
Beetles described in 1903